The Historical Dictionary of Switzerland is an encyclopedia on the history of Switzerland that aims to take into account the results of modern historical research in a manner accessible to a broader audience.

The encyclopedia is published by a foundation under the patronage of the Swiss Academy of Humanities and Social Sciences (SAGW/ASSH) and the Swiss Historical Society (SGG-SHH) and is financed by national research grants. Besides a staff of 35 at the central offices, the contributors include 100 academic advisors, 2500 historians and 100 translators.

Print edition 

The encyclopedia is published simultaneously in three of Switzerland's national languages: German (Historisches Lexikon der Schweiz, HLS, in red), French (Dictionnaire Historique de la Suisse, DHS, in blue) and Italian (Dizionario Storico della Svizzera, DSS, in yellow). The first of a total of 13 volumes was published in 2002 and the final volume was in 2014. All volumes are available in German, French and Italian, and an abbreviated version in 2 volumes (3100 articles) is available in Romansh (Lexicon Istoric Retic).

The 36,000 headings are grouped in:
 Biographies (35%)
 Articles on families and genealogy (10%)
 Articles on places (municipalities, cantons, other nation states, fortresses, signories, abbeys, archeological sites) (30%)
 Subject articles (historical phenomena and terms, institutions, events) (25%)

On-line edition 
The on-line edition has been available since 1998. It makes accessible, for free, all articles ready for publication in print, but no illustrations. It also lists all 36,000 topics that are to be covered.

Lexicon Istoric Retic 
Lexicon Istoric Retic (LIR) is a two volume version with a selection of articles published in Romansh. It includes articles not available in the other languages. The first volume was published in 2010, the second in 2012. An on-line version is also available.

Editions
 Historisches Lexikon der Schweiz (HLS), Schwabe AG, Basel,  (2002–)
 Dictionnaire historique de la Suisse (DHS), Editions Gilles Attinger, Hauterive,  (2002–)
 Dizionario storico della Svizzera (DSS), Armando Dadò editore, Locarno,  (2002–)
 Lexicon Istoric Retic (LIR), Kommissionsverlag Desertina, Chur,  (vol.1: Abundi à Luzzi),  (vol. 2: Macdonald à Zwingli)

References

External links

 DHS/HLS/DSS online edition in German, French and Italian
 Lexicon Istoric Retic (LIR) online edition in Romansh

2002 books
Historiography of Switzerland
Encyclopedias of history
German-language encyclopedias
French encyclopedias
Italian-language encyclopedias
Romansh-language mass media
21st-century encyclopedias
Swiss online encyclopedias
1998 establishments in Switzerland
Swiss encyclopedias
National encyclopedias
Online databases
Organisations based in Switzerland
Historical dictionaries